The 2009–10 Washington Wizards season was the 49th season of the Washington Wizards in the National Basketball Association (NBA).

Key dates 
 June 25, 2009 - The 2009 NBA Draft took place in New York City.
 July 8, 2009 - The free agency period started.
 January 6, 2010 - Commissioner David Stern suspended guard Gilbert Arenas indefinitely following his actions involving the use of guns in the team locker room.
 January 27, 2010 - Commissioner Stern suspends Arenas and Javaris Crittenton for the remainder of the season as a result of the use of guns in a team locker room.

2009 NBA Draft

Roster

Regular season

Standings

Record vs. opponents

Game log 

|- bgcolor="#bbffbb"
| 1
| October 27
| @ Dallas
| 
| Gilbert Arenas (29)
| Brendan Haywood (10)
| Gilbert Arenas (9)
| American Airlines Center19,871
| 1-0
|- bgcolor="#ffcccc"
| 2
| October 30
| @ Atlanta
| 
| Gilbert Arenas (23)
| Mike Miller (10)
| Randy Foye (6)
| Philips Arena17,079
| 1-1
|- bgcolor="#bbffbb"
| 3
| October 31
| New Jersey
| 
| Gilbert Arenas (32)
| Mike Miller (11)
| Randy Foye (8)
| Verizon Center20,173
| 2-1

|- bgcolor="#ffcccc"
| 4
| November 3
| @ Cleveland
| 
| Gilbert Arenas, Caron Butler (22)
| Brendan Haywood (9)
| Gilbert Arenas (5)
| Quicken Loans Arena20,562
| 2-2
|- bgcolor="#ffcccc"
| 5
| November 4
| Miami
| 
| Gilbert Arenas (32)
| Brendan Haywood (11)
| Gilbert Arenas, Mike Miller & Fabricio Oberto (3)
| Verizon Center17,413
| 2-3
|- bgcolor="#ffcccc"
| 6
| November 6
| @ Indiana
| 
| Caron Butler (24)
| Brendan Haywood (19)
| Gilbert Arenas (5)
| Conseco Fieldhouse14,556
| 2-4
|- bgcolor="#ffcccc"
| 7
| November 8
| Phoenix
| 
| Gilbert Arenas & Andray Blatche (20)
| Brendan Haywood (10)
| Gilbert Arenas (6)
| Verizon Center14,143
| 2-5
|- bgcolor="#ffcccc"
| 8
| November 10
| @ Miami
| 
| Gilbert Arenas (21)
| Brendan Haywood (11)
| Gilbert Arenas (8)
| American Airlines Arena15,054
| 2-6
|- bgcolor="#ffcccc"
| 9
| November 14
| Detroit
| 
| Mike Miller, Earl Boykins (20)
| Andray Blatche (11)
| Gilbert Arenas (10)
| Verizon Center20,173
| 2-7
|- bgcolor="bbffbb"
| 10
| November 18
| Cleveland
| 
| Antawn Jamison (31)
| Brendan Haywood (13)
| Gilbert Arenas (8)
| Verizon Center20,173
| 3-7
|- bgcolor="#ffcccc"
| 11
| November 20
| @ Oklahoma City
| 
| Caron Butler (24)
| Brendan Haywood (16)
| Gilbert Arenas (8)
| Ford Center18,203
| 3-8
|- bgcolor="#ffcccc"
| 12
| November 21
| @ San Antonio
| 
| Gilbert Arenas (18)
| Brendan Haywood (8)
| Earl Boykins (4)
| AT&T Center16,888
| 3-9
|- bgcolor="bbffbb"
| 13
| November 24
| Philadelphia
| 
| Antawn Jamison (32)
| Antawn Jamison (14)
| Gilbert Arenas (8)
| Verizon Center14,485
| 4-9
|- bgcolor="bbffbb"
| 14
| November 27
| @ Miami
| 
| Antawn Jamison (24)
| Antawn Jamison (13)
| Earl Boykins (9)
| American Airlines Arena17,684
| 5-9
|- bgcolor="#ffcccc"
| 15
| November 28
| Charlotte
| 
| Caron Butler (19)
| Brendan Haywood (9)
| Gilbert Arenas (6)
| Verizon Center17,311
| 5-10
|-

|- bgcolor="bbffbb"
| 16
| December 1
| @ Toronto
| 
| Antawn Jamison (30)
| Antawn Jamison (12)
| Gilbert Arenas (9)
| Air Canada Centre15,776
| 6-10
|- bgcolor="bbffbb"
| 17
| December 2
| Milwaukee
| 
| Gilbert Arenas (22)
| Brendan Haywood (14)
| Gilbert Arenas (9)
| Verizon Center12,272
| 7-10
|- bgcolor="#ffcccc"
| 18
| December 4
| Toronto
| 
| Gilbert Arenas (34)
| Brendan Haywood (16)
| Caron Butler & Earl Boykins (5)
| Verizon Center20,173
| 7-11
|- bgcolor="#ffcccc"
| 19
| December 6
| @ Detroit
| 
| Caron Butler (20)
| Brendan Haywood (11)
| Gilbert Arenas (9)
| The Palace of Auburn Hills14,123
| 7-12
|- bgcolor="#ffcccc"
| 20
| December 10
| Boston
| 
| Gilbert Arenas (25)
| Brendan Haywood, Caron Butler & Antawn Jamison (8)
| Gilbert Arenas (8)
| Verizon Center20,173
| 7-13
|- bgcolor="#ffcccc"
| 21
| December 12
| Indiana
| 
| Antawn Jamison (31)
| Gilbert Arenas (10)
| Gilbert Arenas (11)
| Verizon Center13,172
| 7-14
|- bgcolor="#ffcccc"
| 22
| December 14
| @ L.A. Clippers
| 
| Antawn Jamison (32)
| Brendan Haywood (12)
| Gilbert Arenas (9)
| Staples Center14,511
| 7-15
|- bgcolor="#ffcccc"
| 23
| December 16
| @ Sacramento
| 
| Gilbert Arenas (33)
| Brendan Haywood (14)
| Gilbert Arenas (6)
| ARCO Arena16,579
| 7-16
|- bgcolor="bbffbb"
| 24
| December 18
| @ Golden State
| 
| Gilbert Arenas (45)
| Brendan Haywood (12)
| Gilbert Arenas (13)
| Oracle Arena17,423
| 8-16
|- bgcolor="#ffcccc"
| 25
| December 19
| @ Phoenix
| 
| Gilbert Arenas (22)
| Andray Blatche (9)
| Randy Foye (4)
| US Airways Center16,811
| 8-17
|- bgcolor="bbffbb"
| 26
| December 22
| Philadelphia
| 
| Gilbert Arenas (31)
| Gilbert Arenas (8)
| Caron Butler (4)
| Verizon Center15,435
| 9-17
|- bgcolor="bbffbb"
| 27
| December 23
| @ Milwaukee
| 
| Antawn Jamison (25)
| Caron Butler, Antawn Jamison (10)
| Gilbert Arenas (9)
| Bradley Center13,113
| 10-17
|- bgcolor="#ffcccc"
| 28
| December 26
| @ Minnesota
| 
| Gilbert Arenas (26)
| Brendan Haywood (10)
| Gilbert Arenas (9)
| Target Center16,838
| 10-18
|- bgcolor="#ffcccc"
| 29
| December 28
| @ Memphis
| 
| Gilbert Arenas (30)
| Antawn Jamison (13)
| Earl Boykins (6)
| FedExForum14,571
| 10-19
|- bgcolor="#ffcccc"
| 30
| December 29
| Oklahoma City
| 
| Antawn Jamison (28)
| Andray Blatche (9)
| Gilbert Arenas (8)
| Verizon Center17,152
| 10-20

|- bgcolor="#ffcccc"
| 31
| January 2
| San Antonio
| 
| Caron Butler (24)
| Antawn Jamison, Brendan Haywood (9)
| Gilbert Arenas (8)
| Verizon Center19,025
| 10-21
|- bgcolor="bbffbb"
| 32
| January 5
| @ Philadelphia
| 
| Antawn Jamison (32)
| Antawn Jamison (14)
| Gilbert Arenas (14)
| Wachovia Center11,822
| 11-21
|- bgcolor="#ffcccc"
| 33
| January 6
| @ Cleveland
| 
| Antawn Jamison (26)
| Brendan Haywood (7)
| Earl Boykins (6)
| Quicken Loans Arena20,562
| 11-22
|- bgcolor="bbffbb"
| 34
| January 8
| Orlando
| 
| Antawn Jamison (28)
| Brendan Haywood (15)
| Randy Foye, Mike Miller (6)
| Verizon Center20,173
| 12-22
|- bgcolor="#ffcccc"
| 35
| January 10
| New Orleans
| 
| Antawn Jamison (32)
| Brendan Haywood (14)
| Randy Foye (8)
| Verizon Center14,753
| 12-23
|- bgcolor="#ffcccc"
| 36
| January 12
| Detroit
| 
| Antawn Jamison (31)
| Brendan Haywood (15)
| Randy Foye (10)
| Verizon Center13,544
| 12-24
|- bgcolor="#ffcccc"
| 37
| January 13
| @ Atlanta
| 
| Antawn Jamison (25)
| Antawn Jamison (19)
| Randy Foye (8)
| Philips Arena9,695
| 12-25
|- bgcolor="#ffcccc"
| 38
| January 15
| @ Chicago
| OT
| Antawn Jamison (34)
| Brendan Haywood (20)
| Randy Foye (7)
| United Center20,304
| 12-26
|- bgcolor="bbffbb"
| 39
| January 16
| Sacramento
| 
| Caron Butler (19)
| Brendan Haywood (10)
| Randy Foye (6)
| Verizon Center17,242
| 13-26
|- bgcolor="bbffbb"
| 40
| January 18
| Portland
| 
| Antawn Jamison (28)
| Caron Butler (9)
| Randy Foye (5)
| Verizon Center12,209
| 14-26
|- bgcolor="#ffcccc"
| 41
| January 20
| Dallas
| 
| Randy Foye (26)
| Brendan Haywood (18)
| Mike Miller (4)
| Verizon Center13,947
| 14-27
|- bgcolor="#ffcccc"
| 42
| January 22
| Miami
| 
| Andray Blatche (19)
| Andray Blatche (11)
| Earl Boykins (5)
| Verizon Center20,173
| 14-28
|- bgcolor="#ffcccc"
| 43
| January 24
| L.A. Clippers
| 
| Antawn Jamison (20)
| Brendan Haywood (12)
| Caron Butler (4)
| Verizon Center12,356
| 14-29
|- bgcolor="#ffcccc"
| 44
| January 26
| L.A. Lakers
| 
| Antawn Jamison (27)
| Antawn Jamison (9)
| Miller, Boykins & Foye (4)
| Verizon Center20,173
| 14-30
|- bgcolor="bbffbb"
| 45
| January 29
| @New Jersey
| 
| Earl Boykins (15)
| Mike Miller (12)
| Foye, Jamison & Stevenson (2)
| Izod Center11,384
| 15-30
|- bgcolor="bbffbb"
| 46
| January 30
| New York
| 
| Mike Miller (25)
| Jamison (23)
| Mike Miller (8)
| Verizon Center16,233
| 16-30

|- bgcolor="#ffcccc"
| 47
| February 1
| Boston
| 
| Caron Butler (20)
| Caron Butler (11)
| Randy Foye (4)
| Verizon Center20,173
| 16-31
|- bgcolor="#ffcccc"
| 48
| February 3
| @ New York
| 
| Foye & Young (15)
| Brendan Haywood (8)
| Earl Boykins (6)
| Madison Square Garden19,225
| 16-32
|- bgcolor="bbffbb"
| 49
| February 5
| @ Orlando
| 
| Caron Butler (31)
| Brendan Haywood (10)
| Randy Foye (7)
| Amway Arena17,461
| 17-32
|- bgcolor="#ffcccc"
| 50
| February 9
| @ Charlotte
| 
| Caron Butler (23)
| Brendan Haywood (11)
| Caron Butler (8)
| Time Warner Cable Arena12,376
| 17-33
|- bgcolor="bbffbb"
| 51
| February 17
| Minnesota
| 
| Andray Blatche (33)
| Andray Blatche (13)
| Earl Boykins (8)
| Verizon Center13,143
| 18-33
|- bgcolor="bbffbb"
| 52
| February 19
| Denver
| 
| Al Thornton (21)
| Andray Blatche (11)
| Mike Miller (7)
| Verizon Center17,212
| 19-33
|- bgcolor="#ffcccc"
| 53
| February 20
| @ Toronto
| 
| Andray Blatche (24)
| Miller & Howard (7)
| Earl Boykins (6)
| Air Canada Centre19,149
| 19-34
|- bgcolor="bbffbb"
| 54
| February 22
| Chicago
| 
| Andray Blatche (25)
| James Singleton (12)
| Randy Foye (9)
| Verizon Center14,113
| 20-34
|- bgcolor="#ffcccc"
| 55
| February 24
| Memphis
| 
| Andray Blatche (24)
| Al Thornton (11)
| Foye & Miller (7)
| Verizon Center11,875
| 20-35
|- bgcolor="#ffcccc"
| 56
| February 26
| New York
| OT
| Andray Blatche (26)
| Andray Blatche (18)
| Randy Foye (10)
| Verizon Center17,408
| 20-36
|- bgcolor="bbffbb"
| 57
| February 28
| @ New Jersey
| 
| Andray Blatche (36)
| Andray Blatche (15)
| Mike Miller (6)
| Izod Center11,844
| 21-36

|- bgcolor="#ffcccc"
| 58
| March 3
| @ Milwaukee
| 
| Blatche & Foye (18)
| Andray Blatche (9)
| Randy Foye (5)
| Bradley Center13,247
| 21-37
|- bgcolor="#ffcccc"
| 59
| March 5
| Milwaukee
| 
| McGee & Blatche (13)
| JaVale McGee (11)
| Andray Blatche (3)
| Verizon Center16,963
| 21-38
|- bgcolor="#ffcccc"
| 60
| March 7
| @ Boston
| 
| Al Thornton (24)
| Al Thornton (11)
| Randy Foye (8)
| TD Garden18,624
| 21-39
|- bgcolor="#ffcccc"
| 61
| March 9
| Houston
| 
| Young & Blatche (18)
| Al Thornton (9)
| Livingston & Miller (5)
| Verizon Center16,963
| 21-40
|- bgcolor="#ffcccc"
| 63
| March 11
| Atlanta
| 
| Andray Blatche (30)
| Andray Blatche (10)
| Mike Miller (7)
| Verizon Center13,625
| 21-41
|- bgcolor="#ffcccc"
| 63
| March 12
| @ Detroit
| 
| Andray Blatche (23)
| Andray Blatche (10)
| Randy Foye (8)
| The Palace of Auburn Hills20,273
| 21-42
|- bgcolor="#ffcccc"
| 64
| March 13
| Orlando
| 
| Andray Blatche (32)
| Alonzo Gee (5)
| Shaun Livingston (8)
| Verizon Center20,173
| 21-43
|- bgcolor="#ffcccc"
| 65
| March 15
| @ Utah
| 
| Andray Blatche (24)
| Singleton & Miller (10)
| Randy Foye (5)
| EnergySolutions Arena19,611
| 21-44
|- bgcolor="#ffcccc"
| 66
| March 16
| @ Denver
| 
| Andray Blatche (23)
| Alonzo Gee (10)
| Shaun Livingston (6)
| Pepsi Center17,447
| 21-45
|- bgcolor="#ffcccc"
| 67
| March 19
| @ Portland
| 
| Mike Miller (16)
| James Singleton (16)
| Shaun Livingston (4)
| Rose Garden20,592
| 21-46
|- bgcolor="#ffcccc"
| 68
| March 21
| @ L.A. Lakers
| 
| Nick Young (22)
| Andray Blatche (12)
| Shaun Livingston (6)
| Staples Center18,997
| 21-47
|- bgcolor="#ffcccc"
| 69
| March 23
| Charlotte
| OT
| Mike Miller (15)
| JaVale McGee (12)
| Shaun Livingston (6)
| Verizon Center12,742
| 21-48
|- bgcolor="#ffcccc"
| 70
| March 24
| @ Indiana
| 
| Andray Blatche (21)
| James Singleton (21)
| Earl Boykins (3)
| Conseco Fieldhouse12,504
| 21-49
|- bgcolor="#ffcccc"
| 71
| March 26
| @ Charlotte
| 
| Alonzo Gee (19)
| Singleton & Miller (7)
| Mike Miller (8)
| Time Warner Cable Arena16,365
| 21-50
|- bgcolor="#ffcccc"
| 72
| March 27
| Utah
| 
| Andray Blatche (20)
| James Singleton (12)
| Andray Blatche (7)
| Verizon Center15,312
| 21-51
|- bgcolor="#ffcccc"
| 73
| March 30
| @ Houston
| 
| Andray Blatche (31)
| Mike Miller (12)
| Mike Miller (4)
| Toyota Center14,395
| 21-52
|- bgcolor="bbffbb"
| 74
| March 31
| @ New Orleans
| 
| Mike Miller (27)
| Mike Miller (7)
| Shaun Livingston (6)
| New Orleans Arena14,634
| 22-52

|- bgcolor="#ffcccc"
| 75
| April 2
| Chicago
| 
| Andray Blatche (18)
| Andray Blatche (13)
| Blatche & Miller (7)
| Verizon Center18,002
| 22-53
|- bgcolor="bbffbb"
| 76
| April 4
| New Jersey
| 
| Andray Blatche (20)
| Mike Miller (13)
| Andray Blatche (13)
| Verizon Center10,112
| 23-53
|- bgcolor="bbffbb"
| 77
| April 6
| Golden State
| 
| Nick Young (29)
| JaVale McGee (15)
| Livingston & Miller (8)
| Verizon Center14,721
| 24-53
|- bgcolor="#ffcccc"
| 78
| April 7
| @ Orlando
| 
| Nick Young (21)
| Mike Miller (9)
| Mike Miller (5)
| Amway Arena17,461
| 24-54
|- bgcolor="bbffbb"
| 79
| April 9
| @ Boston
| 
| Andray Blatche (31)
| Blatche & McGee (11)
| Livingston & Miller (7)
| TD Garden18,624
| 25-54
|- bgcolor="#ffcccc"
| 80
| April 10
| Atlanta
| 
| Andray Blatche (24)
| JaVale McGee (10)
| Blatche & Livingston (7)
| Verizon Center20,173
| 25-55
|- bgcolor="#ffcccc"
| 81
| April 12
| @ New York
| 
| Mike Miller (23)
| Andray Blatche (10)
| Blatche & Livingston (7)
| Madison Square Garden19,763
| 25-56
|- bgcolor="bbffbb"
| 82
| April 14
| Indiana
| 
| Andray Blatche (26)
| James Singleton (17)
| Shaun Livingston (7)
| Verizon Center16,126
| 26-56

Player statistics

Season

Awards, records and milestones

Awards

Week/Month

All-Star

Season

Records

Milestones

Injuries and surgeries 
 Forward Antawn Jamison missed the first 9 games due to a shoulder injury.
 Forward Mike Miller missed 28 games due to various injuries.
 Forward Josh Howard played in only 4 games before tearing his ACL and missed the rest of the season.
 Guard Randy Foye missed the last 11 games of the season after it was found he required wrist surgery.

Transactions

Trades

Free agents

Additions 
 Signed guard Earl Boykins on November 11, 2009
 Signed forward Mike Harris on February 24, 2010
 Signed guard Shaun Livingston on February 26, 2010
 Signed guard Alonzo Gee on March 7, 2010
 Signed guard Cartier Martin on March 30, 2010
 Signed guard Cedric Jackson on March 31, 2010

Subtractions 
 Waived guard Vincent Grier on October 22, 2009
 Waived forward Paul Davis on November 11, 2009
 Waived center Zydrunas Ilgauskas on February 25, 2010
 Waived guard Mike James on March 1, 2010

References 

Washington Wizards seasons
Washington
Wash
Wash